The National Harbor Line, designated as Route NH1, is a daily bus route operated by the Washington Metropolitan Area Transit Authority between Southern Avenue station of the Green Line of the Washington Metro and National Harbor. The line operates every 30 minutes at rush hour and 40 minutes all other times. NH1 trips are roughly 30–35 minutes. This line provides service to National Harbor and MGM National Harbor from Southern Avenue station. Service to Alexandria, Virginia is provided by the NH2.

Route description 

The NH1 operates beginning at 5:45 AM with the last bus leaving at 12:00 AM connecting Southern Avenue station to National Harbor via Southview Apartments and Oxon Hill Parking Lot. The NH1 operates buses out of Andrews Federal Center division. Prior to 2012, the NH1 would get its buses out of Southern Avenue division, and prior to 2021, the NH1 would get its buses out of Shepherd Parkway division.

NH1 Stops

History

Introduction of the NH1 
National Harbor opened on April 1, 2008 with the opening of the Gaylord National Resort & Convention Center and has since got more attractions like Tanger Outlets and the Capital Wheel through the years. Under the request of Gaylord and National Harbor, WMATA announced new service connecting Southern Avenue station to National Harbor with the new route NH1 beginning on March 23, 2008. The new route will operate 7 days a week between 6 AM and 10 PM every 20 minutes during rush hours and 30 minutes during other times. The state of Maryland pays $312,000 annually for the NH1 operations. In June 2008, Gaylord National Resort and Convention Center have asked Maryland to fund for additional transit service since employees found it difficult to reach National Harbor.

Reroute to Branch Ave 
In August 2009 under the request of National Harbor, WMATA rerouted the NH1 to Branch Avenue station travelling along the Capital Beltway.

The changes caused controversy among workers as they will now have to travel out further on the Green Line to catch the NH1. Service was also deducted in the morning with buses now arriving past 8:00 AM on the weekends. Gaylord requested for WMATA to restore the original routing back to Southern Avenue station.

In response to the changes, Prince George's County created TheBus Route 35 to restore the connection between Southern Ave station and National Harbor.

Route NH3 
In December 2013, WMATA announced a new NH3 route to operate along the former NH1 service between Southern Avenue station and National Harbor during early mornings and late nights with new stops being added of the grand opening of Tanger Outlets Mall. It was also announced that both the NH1 and NH3 will operate via Harborview Avenue instead of National Avenue.

2015 Service Changes 
In 2014, WMATA announced a proposal to restore the NH1 routing to Southern Ave and to discontinue the NH3 completely being replaced by the NH1.

Another proposal was to reroute the NH1 along the Woodrow Wilson Bridge to serve King Street–Old Town station. This routing would later become route NH2 in 2016.

In June 2015, WMATA announced that the NH3 will be discontinued and replaced by the NH1. The NH1 would restore service to Southern Avenue station and will serve Southview Apartments. Service to Branch Avenue station would be discontinued.

2018 Service Changes 
Beginning on September 9, 2018, the St George Blvd & Waterfront St bus stop in National Harbor was discontinued and the NH1 along with the NH2 were rerouted to follow straight on National Harbor Blvd, turn right on Waterfront Street, and make a right turn onto St. George Blvd where it'll serve its current stop at Waterfront St & Potomac Passage. The reason WMATA made the reroute was since of traffic congestion along Downtown National Harbor (Waterfront St) and wanted to offer customers a more efficient trip. However it meant that both the NH1 & NH2 only served one stop at National Harbor.

References 

NH1